The class Holophagaceae is a family of strictly anaerobic Gram negative marine bacteria in the phylum Acidobacteriota.

References

Bacteria orders
Acidobacteriota